Paul McGonagle Sr. (January 21, 1939 – November 1974) was an Irish-American mobster and leader of the Mullen Gang, a South Boston street crew involved in burglary and armed robbery.

Early life
Paul ("Paulie") McGonagle was the oldest of several brothers born to first generation Catholic immigrants from Ireland, and raised in South Boston. One of the brothers was Robert ("Bobby"). Paul and brother Donald ("Donnie", "Donny") were fraternal twins.

Personal life
While in South Boston, he married Margaret Greig (born April 3, 1951), from East Boston, identical twin sister of Catherine Elizabeth Greig, wife of his brother Bobby. They had two sons, Paul Jr. and Sean McGonagle. The Greig sisters had a younger brother David. McGonagle and Margaret moved into a home in suburban Quincy, Massachusetts, where she lived during their marriage. Sister-in-law Catherine later divorced Bobby before taking up with Winter Hill Gang leader James J. Bulger.

Career
During the Killeen-Mullen gang war, McGonagle and Irish immigrant Patrick Nee successfully led the Mullens against the Killeen brothers' organization, which finally ended when the neighbourhood boss Donald Killeen was gunned down outside his suburban home in 1972. The leadership of the Killeen Gang then devolved on Whitey Bulger.

Paul's brother-in-law David was found mysteriously shot in Cape Cod, which was ruled a suicide.

Paul's younger brother Donny lived a law-abiding life and did not follow his brother into a life of organized crime. Donald, however, who shared a fleeting physical resemblance with his brother, was mistaken by Bulger to be Paul and was shot in the head, execution style, in 1971, (an alternative version of events, according to the opposing gang, is that Donald was shot in the face while driving, by another motorist - James "Whitey" Bulger) during the Killeen-Mullen gang war. The FBI stated on their wanted fugitive poster of Catherine Greig that one of the aliases she was known to have used in 1995 before she fled with Bulger was "Catherine McGonagle", taking the last name of her slain brother-in-law as her own after going on the run with Bulger.

According to Kevin Weeks,

One day while the gang war was still going on, Jimmy (Bulger) was driving down Seventh Street in South Boston when he saw Paulie driving toward him. Jimmy pulled up beside him, window to window, nose to nose, and called his name. As Paulie looked over, Jimmy shot him right between the eyes. Only at that moment, just as he pulled the trigger, Jimmy realized it wasn't Paulie. It was Donald, the most likable of the McGonagle brothers, the only one who wasn't involved in anything. Jimmy drove straight to Billy O'Sullivan's house on Savin Hill Avenue and told Billy O, who was at the stove cooking, 'I shot the wrong one. I shot Donald.' Billy looked up from the stove and said, 'Don't worry about it. He wasn't healthy anyway. He smoked. He would have gotten lung cancer. How do you want your pork chops?'

According to former Mullen boss Patrick Nee, Paul McGonagle was enraged by the murder of his brother. Certain that Billy O'Sullivan was responsible, McGonagle ambushed and murdered Bulger's mentor. Rather than murdering Bulger, as some Killeens desired, Patrick Nee arranged for their dispute with him to be mediated by Howie Winter, the godfather of the Irish-American Winter Hill Gang. After a sitdown in the South End, Boston, the two gangs joined forces with Winter as overall boss. Bulger, who proved a reliable moneymaker for Winter, was soon in control of the South Boston rackets.

Disappearance
It has since been revealed by investigators that Bulger was responsible for McGonagle's disappearance in November 1974. It was likely for this reason that Bulger either shot or ordered McGonagle to be shot in the head and buried him in a shallow grave on Boston's Tenean Beach. The murder was almost certainly sanctioned by Howie Winter. At the time of McGonagle's murder in 1974, his estranged wife Margaret was left a widow.

Following the murder and subsequent disappearance of her husband Paul, Margaret was granted a divorce, on grounds of abandonment, and remarried, to a man named McCusker, to whom she was still married .

In September 2003 a body was found among other bodies in Boston that was thought to have been the remains of McGonagle, but this has not been proven to be true.

See also
List of people who disappeared

Further reading
English, T. J. Paddy Whacked: The Untold Story of the Irish American Gangster. New York: HarperCollins, 2005. 
Lehr, Dick and Gerard O'Neill. Black Mass: The Irish Mob, the Boston FBI and a Devil's Deal. New York: Public Affairs, 2000. 
Nee, Patrick. A Criminal and an Irishman, 2006.
Weeks, Kevin, Brutal; The Untold Story of My Life Inside Whitey Bulger's Irish Mob
Halloran, Bob, Impact Statement: a Family's Fight for Justice Against Whitey Bulger, Stephen Flemmi and the FBI, Skyhorse Publishing Inc., 13 December 2013 .

References

1939 births
1970s missing person cases
1974 deaths
American gangsters
Deaths by firearm in Massachusetts
Gangsters from Boston
Male murder victims
Missing gangsters
Missing person cases in Massachusetts
Murdered American gangsters of Irish descent
People murdered by the Winter Hill Gang
People murdered in Massachusetts